Kalika may refer to:
 Kali, also known as Kalika, the Hindu goddess associated with universal energy
 Kālikā, a daughter of Dakṣa

Places in Nepal
 Kalika, Chitwan, Bagmati Province
 Kalika, Sindhupalchok, Bagmati Province
 Kalika, Baglung, Gandaki Province
 Kalika, Kaski, Gandaki Province
 Kalika, Dailekh, Karnali Province
 Kalika, Dolpa, Karnali Province
 Kalika, Humla, Karnali Province
 Kalika, Bardiya, Lumbini Province
 Kalika, Kanchanpur, Sudurpashchim Province
 Kalika, Achham, Sudurpashchim Province
 Kalika Rural Municipality, Bagmati Province
 Shubha Kalika, Karnali Province

Temples
 Maula Kalika Temple, Forest, Mountain Peak (Gaindakot, Nawalparasi, Nepal)
 Kalika Mata Temple (disambiguation)

People
 Kalika (footballer) (born 1999), Portuguese footballer
 Kalika Prasad Bhattacharya (1970–2017), Indian folksinger
 Kalika Prasad Shukla (1921–1993), scholar and poet
 Vasily Kalika (14th century), Russian saint
 Kalika Singh (born 1911), Indian politician

Other uses
 Kalika (film), a 1980 Indian Malayalam film
 Kalika Purana, a Hindu text

See also
 Kalikapur (disambiguation) (disambiguation page)